Czech Games Edition is a company established in 2007 in the Czech Republic that produces board and card games.

Games 
Board games produced by the company include Through the Ages: A New Story of Civilization, Galaxy Trucker, Space Alert, Lost Ruins of Arnak, and Codenames.

Digital app versions are also available of Galaxy Trucker, Codenames, and Through the Ages.

References

External links
 Official website
 Official Through the Ages video game website
 Official Galaxy trucker video game website

Entertainment companies of the Czech Republic
Czech companies established in 2007
Board game publishing companies